Distances is a 2018 Spanish drama film directed by Elena Trapé which stars Alexandra Jiménez, Miki Esparbé, Isak Férriz, Bruno Sevilla and Maria Ribera. It features dialogue in Catalan, Spanish, English and German.

Plot 
The plot deals with the theme of the loss of friendship. Four friends travel from Barcelona to Berlin, set to deliver a surprise birthday party to their friend Comas. However disappointment ensues, as they find things are not as they were before when they were young.

Cast

Production 
Distances was produced by Coming Soon Films in association with TVC, Miss Wasabi and Busse & Halberschmidt, with support from ICEC, ICAA and RTVE. The screenplay was penned by the director  alongside Josan Hatero and Miguel Ibáñez Monroy. Filming began in Berlin in February 2017 and wrapped on 21 March 2017.

Release 
The film was presented on 17 April 2018 at the 21st Málaga Film Festival, screened in the festival's main competition. Distributed by Sherlock Films, it was theatrically released in Spain on 7 September 2018.

Reception 
Beatriz Martínez of Fotogramas gave the film 4 out of 5 stars, praising an "excellent cast" in which Alexandra Jiménex stands out.

Sarah Ward of ScreenDaily described Distances as "a nuanced, quiet and often emotionally claustrophobic film", also considering that it is anchored by "strong performances", with Alexandra Jiménez' role as a pregnant woman being a "particular standout".

Accolades 

|-
| align = "center" rowspan = "3" | 2018 || rowspan = "3" | 21st Málaga Film Festival || colspan = "2" | Golden Biznaga for Best Spanish Film ||  || rowspan = "3" | 
|-
| Silver Biznaga for Best Director || Elena Trapé || 
|-
| Silver Biznaga for Best Actress || Alexandra Jiménez || 
|-
| align = "center" rowspan = "11" | 2019 || 24th Forqué Awards || Best Actress || Alexandra Jiménez ||  || align = "center" | 
|-
| rowspan = "2" | 6th Feroz Awards || Best Actress || Alexandra Jiménez ||  || rowspan = "2" | 
|-
| Best Film Poster || Elena Castillo ||  
|-
| 63rd Sant Jordi Awards || colspan = "2" | Best Spanish Film ||  || align = "center" | 
|-
| rowspan = "7" | 11th Gaudí Awards || colspan = "2" | Best Film ||  || rowspan = "7" | 
|-
| Best Director || Elena Trapé || 
|-
| Best Screenplay || Elena Trapé, Josan Hatero, Miguel Ibáñez Monroy || 
|-
| Best Actress || Alexandra Jiménez || 
|-
| Best Supporting Actress || Maria Ribera || 
|-
| Best Supporting Actor || Miki Esparbé || 
|-
| Best Editing || Liana Artigal || 
|}

See also 
 List of Spanish films of 2018

References

External links 
 Distances at ICAA's Catálogo de Cinespañol

2018 drama films
Spanish drama films
Films set in Berlin
Films shot in Berlin
2010s Catalan-language films
2010s Spanish films